Abdollah Khan Amir Tahmasebi (1881–1928) was a Persian senior military commander, instrumental in the fall of the Qajar dynasty and rise to power of Reza Shah Pahlavi.

He first became well known in Azerbaijan for the successful restoration of law and order, gaining widespread recognition and popularity there. He was then appointed governor of Tehran by Reza Shah, replaced in Azerbaijan by Mohammad Hosein Airom. In 1925, he became Minister of War.

In 1928, while en route to Lurestan to visit a road construction site with some engineers, his group was ambushed by unknown assailants near Borujerd. He died shortly after due to bullet wounds in a hospital in Borujerd.

Reza Shah attended his funeral to pay his respects.

References
 'Alí Rizā Awsatí (عليرضا اوسطى), Iran in the Past Three Centuries (Irān dar Se Qarn-e Goz̲ashteh - ايران در سه قرن گذشته), Volumes 1 and 2 (Paktāb Publishing - انتشارات پاکتاب, Tehran, Iran, 2003).  (Vol. 1),  (Vol. 2).

See also
 Abdolhossein Teymourtash
 Sar Lashgar Buzarjomehri
 Mahmud Khan Puladeen
 Amanullah Jahanbani
 Bahram Aryana

Imperial Iranian Army major generals
Government ministers of Iran
1881 births
1928 deaths
People from Tehran
Governors of West Azerbaijan Province
Governors of East Azerbaijan Province